Tom Towle  (1887–1983) was an American aircraft designer in charge of developing the Ford Trimotor.

Early life 
Towle was raised in Dayton, Ohio and graduated from Yale University in 1920. Towle become an aeronautical engineer for many starting aviation companies.

1921-1922 Dayton-Wright Company
1922-1923 Martin
1923-1924 Aeromarine
1924-1925 Stout Metal Airplane Co
1925-1927 Stout Metal Airplane Division of the Ford Motor Company After disappointing results from the Stout 3-AT, Ford places Towle in charge of the Ford Tri-motor development.
1927 Towle Marine Aircraft - Formed company to build the Towle WC.
1928 Eastman Aircraft Corporation of Detroit - Designed the Eastman E-2 Sea Rover.
1928-1932 Towle Aircraft Company - Reorganized to produce the Towle TA-2 and Towle TA-3 amphibians.
1933 Monocoupe Aircraft Corporation
1933-1935 Lambert Aircraft Towle replaced Clayton Folkerts as chief engineer. Designer of Charles Lindbergh's plane, 1934 Model D-127 Monocoupe, which hangs in Terminal 1 at Lambert-St. Louis International Airport.
1939 Grumman
1941 Hudson Car Company aircraft division - Hired as chief engineer.
1951 Worked for the Church & Dwight company, known for baking soda products.

References 

American aerospace engineers
1887 births
1983 deaths
People from Dayton, Ohio
Yale University alumni
Engineers from Ohio